The 2022 United States House of Representatives election in Delaware was held on November 8, 2022, to elect the U.S. representative from Delaware's at-large congressional district. The election coincided with other elections to the House of Representatives, elections to the United States Senate and various state and local elections. The incumbent Democrat Lisa Blunt Rochester won re-election to a fourth term.

Democratic primary

Candidates

Nominee
Lisa Blunt Rochester, incumbent U.S. Representative

Republican primary

Candidates

Nominee
Lee Murphy, perennial candidate, candidate for this district in 2018 and nominee in 2020

Independent and third party candidates

Declared
Cody McNutt (Libertarian)
David Rogers (Non-Partisan Delaware)

Write-in
Edward Shlikas

General election

Predictions

Endorsements

Polling

Results

Notes

References

External Links
Official campaign websites for candidates
Christopher Hill (R) for Congress
Cody McNutt (L) for Congress
Lee Murphy (R) for Congress
Lisa Blunt Rochester (D) for Congress

2022
Delaware
United States House of Representatives